Christian Donfack Adjoufack (born 20 November 1983 in Yaoundé) is a Cameroonian boxer.  He competed in the light heavyweight event at the 2012 Summer Olympics and was eliminated in the round of 32 by Enrico Kölling. After his defeat, he was one of seven Cameroonian athletes who disappeared from the 2012 London Olympic Village.

References

1983 births
Living people
Olympic boxers of Cameroon
Boxers at the 2012 Summer Olympics
Sportspeople from Yaoundé
Cameroonian male boxers
African Games medalists in boxing
Light-heavyweight boxers
African Games bronze medalists for Cameroon
Competitors at the 2011 All-Africa Games
21st-century Cameroonian people